An annular solar eclipse occurred on  February 24, 1933. A solar eclipse occurs when the Moon passes between Earth and the Sun, thereby totally or partly obscuring the image of the Sun for a viewer on Earth. An annular solar eclipse occurs when the Moon's apparent diameter is smaller than the Sun's, blocking most of the Sun's light and causing the Sun to look like an annulus (ring). An annular eclipse appears as a partial eclipse over a region of the Earth thousands of kilometres wide. Annularity was visible from Chile, Argentina, Portuguese Angola (today's Angola), French Equatorial Africa (parts now belonging to R. Congo and Central African Republic), Belgian Congo (today's DR Congo), Anglo-Egyptian Sudan (parts now belonging to South Sudan and Sudan), Ethiopia, French Somaliland (today's Djibouti), southeastern Italian Eritrea (today's Eritrea), and Mutawakkilite Kingdom of Yemen, Aden Protectorate and Aden Province in British Raj (now belonging to Yemen).

Related eclipses

Solar eclipses of 1931–1935

Saros 129

Metonic series

Notes

References

1933 2 24
1933 in science
1933 2 24
February 1933 events